For the Summer Olympics, there are 15 venues that have been or will be used for judo.

References

Venues
 
Judo